Korrapadu may refer to:
 Korrapadu, Kadapa, village in Kadapa district, Andhra Pradesh, India
 Korrapadu, Guntur, village in Guntur district, Andhra Pradesh, India